Phil Peterson (1906-1981) played for the Brooklyn Dodgers during the 1934 NFL season. He played at the collegiate level with the Wisconsin Badgers.

References

Brooklyn Dodgers (NFL) players
Wisconsin Badgers football players
American football ends
1906 births
1981 deaths